The 2004–05 Football League One was the first season of the renamed Football League Second Division, the third tier of English football.

Changes from last season

From League One
Promoted to Championship
 Plymouth Argyle
 Queens Park Rangers
 Brighton & Hove Albion

Relegated to League Two
 Grimsby Town
 Rushden & Diamonds
 Notts County
 Wycombe Wanderers

To League One
Relegated from Championship
 Walsall
 Bradford City
 Wimbledon (renamed Milton Keynes Dons)

Promoted from League Two
 Doncaster Rovers
 Hull City
 Torquay United
 Huddersfield Town

League table

Play-offs

Semi-finals
First leg

Second leg

Sheffield Wednesday won 3–1 on aggregate.

Tranmere Rovers 2–2 Hartlepool United on aggregate. Hartlepool United won 6–5 on penalties.

Final

Top scorers

References

External links
 Football League Tables

 
EFL League One seasons
2004–05 Football League
3
Eng